Half-Mute is the debut studio album by American post-punk band Tuxedomoon, released on March 15, 1980, by Ralph Records. It was their first long-form record, after two EPs, 1978's No Tears and 1979's Scream with a View. Half-Mute was reissued on CD in 1985 by Cramboy, bundled together with Scream with a View. The album's cover art is by Patrick Roques.

Track listing

Personnel
Adapted from the Half-Mute liner notes.

Tuxedomoon
 Steven Brown – alto saxophone, soprano saxophone, keyboards, synthesizer, drum programming, lead vocals
 Peter Dachert (as Peter Principle) – bass guitar, guitar, synthesizer, drum programming
 Blaine L. Reininger – violin, guitar, bass guitar, keyboards, synthesizer, drum programming, spoken word (A2)

Production and additional personnel
 Jim Renney – engineering
 Patrick Roques – cover art
 Tuxedomoon – production, arrangement

Charts

Release history

References

External links
 

1980 debut albums
Tuxedomoon albums
Celluloid Records albums
Crammed Discs albums
Ralph Records albums